The Airco DH.3 was a British bomber aircraft of the First World War. The DH.3 was designed in 1916 as a long-range day bomber by Geoffrey de Havilland, chief designer at the Aircraft Manufacturing Company. It was a large biplane with wide-span three-bay wings, slender fuselage, and a curved rudder. It was powered by two  Beardmore engines, mounted as pushers between the wings. In addition to tailskid landing gear, two wheels were placed under the nose to prevent it from tipping over on the nose.

A second prototype, designated DH.3A, was built with more powerful  Beardmore engines, and the War Office placed a production order for 50. This order was cancelled before any could be completed, possibly because the climb rate was still far too low, with it taking 58 minutes to reach 6,500 feet, and the other contender, the Royal Aircraft Factory F.E.4 was even worse, which made strategic bombing with these machines impracticable. The two prototypes were scrapped in 1917.

This development first flew in March 1918, but was too late to see squadron service during the war.

Specifications (DH.3)

See also

References

Notes

Bibliography

 Donald, David, ed. The Encyclopedia of World Aircraft. Etobicoke, Ontario, Canada: Prospero Books, 1997, p. 118. .
 Jackson, A.J. De Havilland Aircraft since 1909. London: Putnam, Third edition, 1987. .
 Mason, Francis K. The British Bomber since 1914. London: Putnam, 1994. .

DH.003
1910s British bomber aircraft
Twin-engined pusher aircraft
Biplanes
Military aircraft of World War I
Aircraft first flown in 1916